Józef Glemp (18 December 192923 January 2013) was a Polish cardinal of the Roman Catholic Church. He was Archbishop of Warsaw from 1981 to 2006, and was elevated to the cardinalate in 1983.

Biography

Early life and ordination
Józef Glemp was born in Inowrocław on 18 December 1929 as a son of Kazimierz Glemp and Salomea Kośmicka, and was baptized the same day. His father had participated in the Greater Poland Uprising from 1918 to 1919. Józef studied at the seminaries of Gniezno and Poznań, but his education was interrupted by the World War II; he and his siblings were slave laborers during the Nazi occupation of Poland. Glemp was ordained to the priesthood on 25 May 1956 by Bishop Franciszek Jedwabski. Glemp was of German descent on his father's side. On a visit to Scotland, he claimed Scottish descent on his mother's side.

Early service
Between 1956 and 1959, Glemp was involved in the education of incurable youth and children in Mielżyn and Witkowo. He also taught religion classes in Wągrowiec, Miasteczko Krajeńskie, and Polska Wieś.

After two years of pastoral service in Poznań, Glemp was sent to Rome in 1958 to study canon law at the Pontifical Lateran University, earning his doctorate in utroque iure in 1964, with a thesis on: De evolutione conceptus fictionis iuris. After his practicum he was given the title of Advocate of the Roman Rota. He attended a course in stylistic Latin at the Pontifical Gregorian University and also finished his studies in ecclesial administration.

Chaplain
In 1964, Glemp completed all of his studies in Rome and returned to Gniezno in Poland. He became chaplain of the Dominican and Franciscan Sisters and teacher of religion in the house for delinquent minors. He worked as Secretary of the Seminary of Gniezno and as notary for the Curia and the metropolitan tribunal and also as defender of the bond.

Secretariat of the Primate
In December 1967, he worked in the Secretariat of the Primate, and for 15 years was one of Cardinal Stefan Wyszyński's close collaborators. As the personal chaplain of the Cardinal, he accompanied him on his journeys within Poland and to Rome. He exercised varied responsibilities in the Commissions of the Polish Episcopate and taught Canon Law at the Academy of the Catholic Theology in Warsaw. He participated in several congresses on this topic in Poland and abroad. In 1972 he was named a Chaplain of His Holiness, and in March 1976 he became Canon of the Metropolitan Chapter at Gniezno.

Bishop

On 4 March 1979, John Paul II named Glemp Bishop of Warmia, in the northeast part of Poland and he was consecrated on 21 April, in Gniezno.
After the death of Cardinal Wyszyński on 18 May 1981, he was named Archbishop of Gniezno on 7 July 1981, in union "pro hac vice, ad personam" with the Archdiocese of Warsaw. As Bishop of Gniezno he became also the Primate of Poland.

Cardinal
Glemp was created Cardinal-Priest by John Paul II in the consistory of 2 February 1983 and assigned the titular church of Church of St. Mary in Trastevere. On 25 March 1992, with the restructuring of the Church dioceses in Poland, John Paul II dissolved the union "ad personam" of Gniezno-Warsaw, naming as Metropolitan Archbishop of Gniezno Bishop Henryk Muszynski. The Pope decided that the title of Primate of Poland should remain linked to the historical heritage of S. Adalberto in the Archdiocese of Gniezno and confirmed that Cardinal Józef Glemp, Archbishop of Warsaw, who had custody of the relics of S. Adalberto, which were venerated in the Cathedral of Gniezno, should continue to bear the title of Primate of Poland. Pope Benedict XVI stipulated that Cardinal Glemp, despite his retirement, would remain primate until 18 December 2009, his 80th birthday.

Episcopal conference
Cardinal Glemp acted as President of the Episcopal Conference of Poland for 23 years, from 1981 until March 2004.

He was president delegate to the 1st Special Assembly for Europe of the Synod of Bishops (1991).

Glemp was one of the cardinal electors who participated in the 2005 papal conclave that selected Pope Benedict XVI.

Apostolic administrator
On 7 January 2007, it was announced that Cardinal Glemp would be acting as the Apostolic Administrator of the Archdiocese of Warsaw due to the resignation of Stanisław Wielgus. On 3 March 2007, Kazimierz Nycz was appointed to the Warsaw see.

Death 

Glemp died from lung cancer on 23 January 2013 in Warsaw at the age of 83. Funeral celebrations lasted three days, from 26 to 28 January 2013, and took place in three major churches of Warsaw. On Saturday, 26 January, the cardinal's body was lying in state in the Visitationist Church. On Sunday, the coffin was moved to the Church of the Holy Cross, where a Holy Mass was celebrated by Archbishop Celestino Migliore, the apostolic nuncio to Poland, with the sermon preached by Archbishop Józef Michalik, the head of the Polish Conference of Bishops. After the mass, a funeral procession took the coffin to St. John's Cathedral. The Monday, 28 January 2013 Funeral Mass was attended by president Bronisław Komorowski and his wife Anna, former president Lech Wałęsa, former prime minister Tadeusz Mazowiecki, representatives from the judiciary, the Senate, and the Sejm, and other high-ranking officials from various institutions. Over a hundred prelates from Poland and abroad (among them, Prague's Cardinal Dominik Duka, Budapest's Cardinal Peter Erdo, Barcelona's Cardinal Lluis Martinez Sistach, Cologne's Cardinal Joachim Meisner, and Zagreb's Cardinal Josip Bozanić) concelebrated, with Cardinal Stanisław Dziwisz, the Archbishop of Kraków, presiding. The homily was given by the Archbishop of Gniezno, Józef Kowalczyk, the incumbent Primate of Poland. Afterwards, the late primate was entombed in a crypt of the cathedral.

Curial membership

Oriental Churches (congregation)
Culture (council)
Apostolic Signatura (tribunal)

Views

Radio Maryja
Primate Jozef Glemp said in 2005 that the Catholic Radio Maryja was causing a rift in the Church.

Wielgus affair
During the controversy surrounding the alleged collaboration of bishop Stanislaw Wielgus with the communist secret services, Cardinal Glemp said that the prelate was a true servant of God and that media accusations against him were unfounded or exaggerated.

Controversial 1989 sermon
Glemp gave a homily in 1989 for which he faced criticism for years afterwards. In it, he suggested that Jews had spread alcoholism in Poland, and talked of Jewish control of the media. In 1991, Glemp wrote a letter to an American archbishop in which he expressed regret for the sermon, and said he recognized that it might have caused pain among Jews. During his visit to the United States later that year, Glemp met with a dozen Jewish leaders inside the residence of John Cardinal O'Connor in New York while about 100 protestors demonstrated outside. In that meeting, Glemp and the Jewish leaders set up a program in which Jewish scholars would go to Poland and teach about the contributions and history of Jews in Poland.

Notes

References

External links 
List of Primates of Poland 

 Virtual tour Gniezno Cathedral  

1929 births
2013 deaths
Archbishops of Warsaw
Archbishops of Gniezno
Bishops of Warmia
Cardinals created by Pope John Paul II
Deaths from lung cancer
Members of the Apostolic Signatura
People from Inowrocław
20th-century Polish cardinals
Pontifical Gregorian University alumni
Pontifical Lateran University alumni
21st-century Polish cardinals
Members of the Order of the Holy Sepulchre